The 2000 Alaska Milkmen season was the 15th season of the franchise in the Philippine Basketball Association (PBA).

Draft picks

Transactions

Championship
The Alaska Milkmen won the All-Filipino Cup title with a 4-1 series win over the Purefoods Tender Juicy Hotdogs. This was the third All-Filipino crown for Alaska in the last five seasons and winning every two years, first in 1996 and then in 1998.

Roster

Elimination round

Games won

References

Alaska Aces (PBA) seasons
Alaska